You're Not You is the debut novel by U.S. author Michelle Wildgen. It was published by St. Martin’s Press in 2006 and concerns a college student who cares for a classical pianist suffering with Lou Gehrig's disease.

Film adaptation
In October 2014, a film adaption of You're Not You was released, starring Hilary Swank and Emmy Rossum.

References

2006 American novels
St. Martin's Press books
2006 debut novels